Karina Gerber (born 18 May 1977) is a South African modern pentathlete. She represented South Africa at the 2000 Summer Olympics held in Sydney, Australia in the women's modern pentathlon and she finished in 18th place.

References

External links 
 

1977 births
Living people
South African female modern pentathletes
Olympic modern pentathletes of South Africa
Modern pentathletes at the 2000 Summer Olympics
20th-century South African women
21st-century South African women